Line 2 Bloor–Danforth is a subway line in the Toronto subway system, operated by the Toronto Transit Commission (TTC). It opened on February 26, 1966, and extensions at both ends were completed in 1968 and again in 1980.

The line runs primarily a few metres north of Bloor Street from its western terminus at Kipling Avenue with a direct connection to the Kipling GO Station to the Prince Edward Viaduct east of Castle Frank Road, after which the street continues as Danforth Avenue and the line continues running a few metres north of Danforth Avenue until just east of Main Street, where it bends northeasterly and runs above-grade until just east of Warden station, where it continues underground to its eastern terminus, slightly east of Kennedy Road on Eglinton Avenue, which has a direct connection to the Kennedy GO Station. The subway line is closed nightly for maintenance, during which Blue Night Network bus routes provide service along the route.

The most travelled part of the line is located in Toronto's midtown area known as Yorkville. Towards the east, where the line runs parallel to Danforth Avenue, it serves areas such as Greektown (also known as "the Danforth") and the East Danforth neighbourhood. It then runs through a very short stretch of East York to its eastern terminus in Scarborough, where it connects to Line 3 Scarborough. To the west of Yorkville, the line continues along Bloor Street serving many communities such as the Annex, Koreatown, Bloorcourt Village, Bloordale Village, Junction Triangle, Bloor West Village, a very short stretch in York, and the Kingsway and Islington–Etobicoke City Centre areas in Etobicoke, where it terminates at Kipling Avenue in Six Points.

Construction of an extension to Sheppard Avenue and McCowan Road to replace Line 3 Scarborough began on June 23, 2021.

Name
When the Bloor–Danforth line, the second subway line in the city, opened in 1966, it necessitated renaming the first subway line to the Yonge line. Unofficially, the subway lines were already numbered, but in October 2013, the TTC announced plans to give the lines an official number to help riders and visitors to navigate the system. The subway was formerly internally known as route 601. Since the mid-2010s, it is publicly referred to as "Line 2 Bloor–Danforth".

History

Pre-subway era

The earliest mention of rapid transit along the Bloor–Danforth line's route was made in a 1910 report that was prepared by an American firm of transit consultants. This study had been commissioned by a special commission, which included City Controller Horatio Clarence Hocken and Mayor of Toronto Joseph Oliver. In their final report, the consultants suggested that the Prince Edward Viaduct, which spans the Don River Valley, should include a lower deck for a future subway. The lower deck was built, but the first plan for a line to use it was not made until June 15, 1933, when the TTC published a report which suggested construction of a subway and an expressway broadly following Bloor Street and Danforth Avenue. Plans for a somewhat longer route, running east to west from Victoria Park Avenue to the Humber River, were proposed by the Toronto Planning Board in December 1943, although the report did not include costings. During the fall of 1911, the City of Toronto put out a tender for the construction of concrete tubes to carry a subway. However, when the cost of the subway was put to a referendum, the construction of the subway tunnels was rejected.

Before the subway was built, the Bloor streetcar line operated along the route between Jane Street and Luttrell Avenue (located near Shoppers World Danforth). Paired PCC streetcars or multiple units (MUs) operated from 1950 to the opening of the subway line in 1966. The TTC favoured this route because the Prince Edward Viaduct made it easier to build a subway across the Don Valley, and the streetcar that ran along the route was filled with passengers travelling from East York and Scarborough. To provide relief to this streetcar line and to ease expansion into the suburbs, the line was built a few metres north of both Bloor Street and Danforth Avenue.

Subway construction

During the period after World War II, rapid development created a need for more public transit. A referendum on whether a subway should be constructed along Yonge Street was held on January 1, 1946, and this proposal received majority support. The opening of the Yonge subway in 1954 resulted in another plan by the TTC for a Bloor–Danforth line, this time without an expressway, costing $146million. The line was approved, but was not built.

In the 1950s, there was intense debate over where the second Toronto subway line would run as it would affect how bus routes in Toronto's suburbs would operate. There were two main plans. While both shared the same route at the outer ends, the TTC favoured a route that continued eastwards from Christie station to Pape station. This plan was championed by the TTC chairman, Allan Lamport, and also included an extension of the Yonge line from Union station northwards to meet the new line at St. George station. The other plan, which was proposed by the city's planning department and endorsed by the Metro Toronto chairman, Fred Gardiner, had a large "U"-shaped diversion in the centre. From Christie station, it ran south to Queen Street West, and after following Queen Street eastwards to Pape Avenue, turned north to rejoin the east–west route at Pape station. The eastern routing is similar to the Relief Line subway proposal of the 2010s and its successor, the Ontario Line.

In 1956, Toronto's midtown area was starting to experience growth. There was a public debate about the two schemes between the two chairmen and the municipalities that made up Metropolitan Toronto. The extension of the Yonge line along University Avenue, and the east–west Bloor–Danforth line extension were authorized on September 5, 1958 by the Ontario Municipal Board which sought a compromise between the involved communities. The financing of the project was controversial. For the first time, financing was to be split between the TTC and Metro Toronto, incurring a property tax increase. This was opposed by Etobicoke, Long Branch, Mimico, New Toronto and Scarborough, who wanted the project to be funded solely by the TTC. The battle to stop the project went to the Supreme Court of Canada.

The University line opened in 1963, and the Bloor–Danforth line opened from Keele station in the west to Woodbine station in the east on February 26, 1966. Nine men died during its construction. Most of the line was built underground using the cut-and-cover method, with some sections built using a tunnel boring machine. Other parts of the line were built above ground in grade separated rail corridors. The cost of the initial section was $200million ($billion in  dollars).

Once the line started full operation, construction of extensions to the Bloor–Danforth line began. The extensions to Islington station in the west and Warden station in the east opened simultaneously on May 11, 1968. These were completed at a cost of $77million ($million in  dollars). On November 21, 1980, the line was extended to the current terminal stations of Kipling station in the west and Kennedy station in the east at a further cost of $110million ($million in  dollars).

Subway operations

Upon opening, the Bloor–Danforth line was well received: a survey taken four months later showed that the subway was used by 10,000 riders per hour. As a result, many bus and streetcar routes were either discontinued or shortened. Various bus and streetcar routes that connected to the subway stations allowed the line to continue to grow and become more sustainable. The line carries an average of 503,060 passengers on weekdays during the 2015 operating year.

For the first six months of operation, the subway was operated as a single system, with trains from Eglinton station running through to either Keele or Woodbine station, while other trains connected the latter two points. However, the manoeuvre made operation of both lines more difficult, and the practice was abandoned after the initial trial period, leaving Lower Bay station abandoned.

In 1971, Metro Council insisted that the zone fare system be removed to allow residents of the suburbs to travel anywhere with a single fare. This created problems when transferring from the subway to the buses, which were in different zones at the same location. The solution was a change in political thinking, where the subway was seen as a subsidized public service, instead of a utility that needed to balance its books.

On October 15, 1976, an arsonist lit a fire on a subway train at Christie station. The fire destroyed four subway cars and some wall tiles, and resulted in a section of the subway being closed for a few days. As a result, the middle section of Christie station has different-coloured trim tiles. On September 19, 2007, the station modernization program was started. This program would result in making the subway system more accessible, add new bus and streetcar platforms, and improve the connections to regional buses and GO trains.

Stations 

Kipling station, the western terminus of Line 2 Bloor–Danforth, is located near Kipling Avenue and Dundas Street West. It also meets the Yonge Street line at Yonge station. The route's eastern terminus is located at Kennedy station, which is also the southern terminus of Line 3 Scarborough. The line does not run under Bloor Street or Danforth Avenue, except at the Prince Edward Viaduct; otherwise, it is offset to the north. In some areas, it runs under parks and parking lots behind the businesses on the north side of the street, while other sections run under side streets.

Most stations on the Bloor–Danforth line have side platforms. At the surface, some stations are designed to be a part of a shopping area, which are located above the subway. Other stations are large facilities on the surface that also contain bus and/or streetcar platforms to allow transfers to take place.

Designs

The pre-1980 subway stations of the Bloor–Danforth line follow a two-colour background and trim theme and use the unique Toronto Subway typeface on the stations' walls. The tiling theme was influenced by SEPTA's Broad Street Subway in Philadelphia and used a cycle that was similar to the design employed on the Yonge subway. This design consists of two colours for the tiles, one for main wall tiles and another for trim tiles near the ceiling of the stations. The station names on the main wall tiles use the colour of the trim tiles and vice versa, except that some of the station names of the trim tiles are white instead of the main wall tile colour for readability.

This pattern is based on a design similar to the stations along the University line, which follow a regular pattern with some small variances, which are the result of multiple events. One of these tiling variances is located at Christie station, where some of the original tiles were replaced following the 1976 arson attack. The replacement trim tiles were differently coloured due to the lack of extra green trim tiles.

Other variations to the pattern can be observed at Islington and Warden stations, as well as at the former bus bay of Victoria Park station, the three of which have a tricolour design. The current terminus stations of Kipling and Kennedy stations, upon initial opening in 1980, resemble the second version of Union subway station. When they opened, Kipling and Kennedy stations were the only Line 2 stations not to use the Toronto Subway typeface. However, in late 2017, Kipling station was redesigned to use the Toronto Subway typeface as well, leaving Kennedy station being the sole station on Line 2 not to use the typeface.

Modernization program

As the stations on the line have begun to show signs of aging, the TTC has initiated a station modernization program aimed at improving accessibility and appearances at several subway stations. These modernizations include new and updated wall finishes, signage, lighting and public art, as well as the installation of elevators for accessibility needs.  and  stations are the first slated for modernization under this project, and Islington will also be modernized under larger capital projects aimed at greater accessibility and reconstruction of bus loading platforms. Construction of a second access route at Broadview station was completed in 2007. This work provided direct access to bus platforms and a new streetcar platform, improving traffic control within the station. Victoria Park station's modernization project was completed between 2008 and 2011 to make the station more functional, attractive, better connected to the surrounding community, and fully accessible.

The second exit program was also included in station modernization projects after a fire safety audit revealed several at-risk stations with only one means of access and egress from the subway platform level to the street. Some stations with only one entrance/exit received a second means of access/egress during major overhauls at stations such as Pape and Dufferin. Due to the potential for land expropriation and construction of the exit structures in residential neighbourhoods, this portion of the program has become controversial, as some houses need to be removed to accommodate these secondary exits. Plans to add a second exit for Donlands, Greenwood, and Woodbine stations were deferred in late February 2011 due to lack of funding. In September 2017, the addition of elevators and a second exit/automatic entrance were completed at Woodbine station, rendering it fully accessible. As of July 2020, modernization work for Donlands station is planned to begin in the fourth quarter of 2020.

Fare collection

All types of TTC fares are accepted at staffed subway station entrances. Presto cards can be purchased and loaded with money or digital monthly TTC passes at automatic fare vending machines, which also sell Presto 1-ride, 2-ride or day pass tickets. Presto cards and tickets are accepted at all TTC subway station entrances.

On December 1, 2019, all subway station collector booths were permanently closed and replaced by roaming customer service attendants. While customers would still be able to pay their fares by senior or youth TTC tickets, tokens or day passes, these were no longer available for purchase at stations and no change will be given to customers who pay cash fares.

All Line 2 stations except Chester connect to surface TTC bus or streetcar routes during regular operating hours. Some connections require proof-of-payment. Valid proof-of-payment includes paper transfers – free supplementary tickets obtained at the point of entering the transit system that allow the rider to transfer to another route on a one-way continuous direction with no stopovers or backtracking permitted – and Presto cards, which provide unlimited two-hour transfers in any direction across the TTC network.

Service

Frequency
The frequency for this line is 2–3 minutes during peak periods and 4–5 minutes during off-peak periods.

The Route 300 Bloor–Danforth bus provides late-night service to the area around the stations when the subway is not in operation. This service operates frequently along Bloor Street and Danforth Avenue between East/West Mall and Kennedy station via Danforth Road, Brimley Road, Eglinton Avenue East, North/South Service Road, Transway Crescent and Kennedy Road. On Sundays, these routes operate through the early morning hours, because the subway starts service at 8:00 a.m. instead of the usual 6:00 a.m. Frequency is 6–30 minutes.

Capacity
As of 2016, Line 2 was running at capacity with almost 26,000 peak-hour riders. Upgraded signalling would allow for more frequent trains and expand peak-hour capacity to almost 33,000 riders by 2031.

Rolling stock

The first trains to operate on Line 2 were the M1-series subway trains, which were among the first subway trains to be manufactured in Canada. At the time of construction, these subway cars were the longest in the world. As a result of  camshaft propulsion controls, the increased speed provided by the M-series trains and the H-series trains allowed the Bloor–Danforth line to operate efficiently between Islington and Warden without the need for a larger subway fleet. As a result, the G-series subway trains were exclusively confined to the Yonge–University line. In the 1980s, as the H-series trains took over, the M-series trains were only used during rush hour as the trains were linked to be made up of vehicles of a single class. With the introduction of the T1-series subway trains (which had been used exclusively on the Yonge–University–Spadina line during their first years of service in the late 1990s), the M1-series trains were retired from service between 1998 and 1999.

Due to the opening of the Bloor–Danforth line and the additional services that were required, a new set of trains were purchased from the Hawker Siddeley group. These trains, which were a part of the H series, were similar to the M1-series trains with newer features such as electrically operated doors. With the introduction of the T1-series subway trains, the H1 and H2 trains were retired from service, while the remaining H4 trains (along with some earlier T1 series trains) were shifted to the Bloor–Danforth line.

Following the introduction of the Toronto Rocket subway trains on the Yonge–University and Sheppard lines, all of the T1-series trains were transferred to the Bloor–Danforth line, where they replaced the remaining H4- and H6-series subway trains. The T1s are now the only trains operating on the line. The remaining H4 trains were retired from revenue service throughout the fall of 2011, and the last cars were decommissioned on January 27, 2012. They were the last version of TTC trains that were not equipped with air-conditioning systems (but instead used ceiling fans); they were also the last of which to be outfitted with larger orange upholstered bench seating and were mainly used on weekdays, most often during rush hour several years before their retirement. The H4s also had a similar interior design based on the H2 subway cars. The H6-series trains (which had bright orange doors and panels, individual seats, along with light brown floors, cream walls and brown simulated wood grain panels) were retired from service between 2013 and 2014; the final run for the last H6-series train took place on June 20, 2014. In the summer of 2016, a few TR trains were used on Line 2 because of an air conditioning malfunction in numerous individual T1 cars, combined with a hotter than average summer. This was after Toronto Mayor John Tory accepted a challenge posted on Twitter to ride an overheated T1 train on Line 2 during a hot summer day.

The TTC estimated that the T1 fleet's useful life would end in 2026. In 2017, the TTC planned to replace the T1 fleet with 62 new trains, possibly using the TR type from Bombardier to eliminate the time needed to prototype a different model. However, in March 2019, the TTC reversed its decision and planned to delay the purchase of new train sets by refurbishing the T1 fleet to extend its life by a decade. The cost of refurbishment was estimated at $715million, versus $1.86billion required to replace the T1 fleet. Refurbishment would not include installing automatic train control (ATC) equipment on the T1 fleet, while new train sets would have included this feature, and this choice will thus delay the implementation of ATC on Line 2 by ten years. It was concurrently revealed the TTC lacked the facilities to store and maintain a new fleet as a new Kipling carhouse, which was originally planned to open in the mid-2020s, was now scheduled to open in 2031.

Procurement of new trains (2020s) 
On August 6, 2020, the TTC issued a request for information (RFI) to gather information from potential suppliers to identify those who would be interested in designing and supplying new subway trains (NST) to the TTC. The RFI closed on September 18, 2020, and the TTC hosted an information session date on May 4, 2021, with potential suppliers to discuss the background, industry engagement, procurement model, and technical overview with interested NST manufacturers. The TTC later issued a request for proposal (RFP) on October 13, 2022, to the prequalified proponents to submit proposals for delivering the NST. Prequalified rail vehicle manufacturers included Alstom Transport Canada, CRRC Qingdao Sifang, Hyundai Rotem, and Kawasaki Rail Car.

Depot

Most trains that serve the Bloor–Danforth line are stored at the Greenwood Yard, which opened with the first segment of the line. Before the yard was built, the land was occupied by a quarry and a garbage dump. Due to its location next to the Canadian National Railway (and GO Transit) tracks, it was possible for trains to be delivered directly to the subway. The CN rail tracks were converted to allow for the storage of more subway trains as the T1-series trains were shifted from Yonge–University–Spadina line to the Bloor–Danforth line. In addition to providing storage for subway trains, the Greenwood Yard is also used to maintain vehicles that operate on Line 3 Scarborough, as the McCowan Yard is only equipped for vehicle storage and to perform basic maintenance of vehicles.

The Keele Yard (originally known as the Vincent Yard) is a small facility located between Keele station and Dundas West station. It provides for the storage and cleaning of subway trains but not for maintenance. Since June 18, 2017, the yard stores and services four trains overnight with the remaining yard capacity used to store work equipment.

The TTC is planning to build a new subway yard on the site of a former CPR freight yard, southwest of Kipling station. When the TTC replaces the T1 subway fleet, it will need space to store the new trains as they are delivered as well as new shops to service them. The Greenwood Yard will be inadequate as it is completely full with no room to expand, and because its facilities are optimized for two-car train sets rather than the six-car train sets of the proposed new fleet. The estimated cost of the new yard was $500million, of which only $7million for planning work was included in the Capital Budget as of July 2017. , the TTC estimated that the Kipling Yard would open in 2031.

Expansion plans

Scarborough Subway Extension 

The Scarborough Subway Extension (SSE) will replace Line 3 Scarborough with an eastward extension of Line 2.

Earlier history
In 1983, there was discussion of a rapid transit extension from Kennedy to Scarborough City Centre. As multiple types of technologies were examined many politicians requested a subway extension instead of the then proposed streetcar line. Instead, a medium-capacity rail system, known as the Scarborough RT, was built.

In 2005, Toronto City Council again proposed to extend the line northeastward as a replacement for the aging Scarborough RT. In 2006, this proposal was then altered when Scarborough councillors agreed to support plans to refurbish the existing line using other light-metro options for Scarborough. Using heavy-rail rapid transit like the rest of the Toronto subway in Scarborough was not yet examined.

Light rail proposal (2007–2013)
In 2007, mayor David Miller included the refurbishment of the Scarborough RT using modern light rail transit as part of his Transit City plan. The light rail line would have run between Kennedy station and Sheppard Avenue East via Scarborough Town Centre. The line would have used the right-of-way of the Scarborough RT, which would have been shut down for conversion to light rail, requiring bus substitution. Construction would have lasted 3 to 5 years and cost about $2billion plus an unknown cost to redesign the connection at Kennedy station.

During his 2010 mayoralty campaign, Rob Ford denounced the idea of light rail transit and instead proposed to replace the Scarborough RT with an extension of the Bloor–Danforth line. However, on March 31, 2011, Ford agreed with the provincial government that the province's Metrolinx agency would replace the Scarborough RT with an elevated light rail line as part of a proposed Eglinton–Scarborough Crosstown line instead. In June 2012, the idea of a Scarborough subway extension was a key part of Toronto's proposed OneCity transit plan. This plan was later rejected by the provincial government and Mayor Rob Ford.

Three-stop proposal (2013–2016)
On September 4, 2013, the province of Ontario announced that it would fund two-thirds of the  extension of the Bloor–Danforth line from Kennedy to Scarborough City Centre at Scarborough Centre station. The federal government of Canada would fund the remaining one-third. Toronto City Council approved the extension by a vote of 24–20 on October 8, 2013. The subway route would extend eastward towards McCowan Road, via Eglinton Avenue and Danforth Road, and proceeding north towards the intersection of McCowan Road and Sheppard Avenue, via Scarborough City Centre. There would be three new stations at Lawrence Avenue East (serving the Scarborough General Hospital), Scarborough Town Centre and Sheppard Avenue East. The city would also raise property taxes annually over the next three years. Digging of the extension was expected to begin as early as 2018, with a completion within five years.

At that time, he was told the extra station would add $100million to $150million to the cost of the extension.

However, a subsequent city staff report indicated that the proposed stations at Lawrence Avenue and at Sheppard Avenue had "little development potential" nearby and were too close to planned SmartTrack stations.

In 2016, when this proposal was abandoned, about five percent of the design was complete, and the cost was estimated at between $4.6billion and $6.9billion.

One-stop proposal (2016–2019)
On January 20, 2016, city staff issued a proposal to eliminate two of the three stops on the planned Scarborough Subway Extension and to terminate Line 2 Bloor–Danforth at Scarborough Town Centre. The planned intermediate stop at Lawrence Avenue would be eliminated along with the proposed stretch to Sheppard Avenue. This revised plan would prevent the subway from competing for ridership with SmartTrack's branch to Markham. Also, the proposed change was to reduce the cost of the extension from $3.5billion to $2.5billion, where the $1billion saved would be used to extend Line 5 Eglinton east- and northwards to University of Toronto Scarborough. (However, most of the $1billion saved was subsequently diverted back to the SSE to cover additional estimated construction costs for the one-stop subway.)

City planning staff estimated that the peak ridership of the one-stop extension to be 7,300 in the peak hour and peak direction, about half of the 15,000 peak ridership considered the low end to justify a subway. With the original three-stop extension, the peak ridership estimate was 9,500 to 14,000; however, that estimate was reduced to 7,300 because of competition from the proposed SmartTrack and by the elimination of two of the three original stops. Mayor John Tory and Scarborough Councillor Glenn De Baeremaeker say a peak ridership of 7,300 would have still been acceptable as it was still greater than the 6,000 peak at terminal station Kipling. However, a Toronto Star article points out there would be only one station within 6 kilometres of Scarborough Town Centre but more stations are within 6 kilometres of other terminal stations to boost ridership. The SSE would have carried an estimated 31,000 riders per day as compared to 66,355 riders from Kipling to Jane (five stations) and 96,660 riders from Finch to York Mills (four stations). The SSE would have performed better in ridership only against the terminal of the underperforming Sheppard line.

In June 2016, the estimated cost of the one-stop SSE was revised from $2billion to $2.9billion because tunnels need to be deeper than expected in some places, with the new terminal station being 45 to 90 per cent deeper. An additional cost factor is that a high water table would require more concrete. There is also a $300million maintenance cost to keep Line 3 Scarborough operating until the SSE's opening resulting in a total project cost of $3.2billion.

In February 2017, city staff reported that the estimated cost of the extension would increase by $150million to $3.35billion in order to build a 34-bay bus terminal at Scarborough Town Centre, which was to be the largest bus terminal of the TTC system. Also, the projection for new riders for the extension was revised downwards to 2,300 per day, down from the 4,500 new riders estimated in the summer of 2016.

In March 2017, city staff estimated the extension would take six years to construct with an expected opening in the second quarter of 2026. The project was funded. On March 28, 2017, city council approved the design of the  extension via McCowan Road.

According to transit advocate Steve Munro, the SSE would have been built to use only automatic train control (ATC). This would preclude the operation of T1 subway cars on the extension as it would have been too expensive to convert T1 cars to ATC.

In April 2019, city staff revised estimates for the SSE project, by then known as the Line 2 East Extension (L2EE), to a total of $3.87billion with a completion date estimated for end of 2027 and a delayed opening date of 2030 for the bus terminal at Scarborough Centre. In addition, plans for the extension to run ATC upon opening were dropped and instead replaced with the inclusion of "enabling works" allowing for ATC to be implemented at a later date.

Revised three-stop proposal (2019–present)

In May 2018, Rob Ford's brother Doug Ford – during his campaign to become premier of Ontario – pledged to work on and pay for the three-stop proposal. In July 2018, the TTC was still focused on building the one-stop proposal.

On April 10, 2019, Doug Ford, who had since become premier, announced that the province would revert the extension back to the three-stop proposal at an estimated cost of $5.5billion with an estimated completion date between 2029 and 2030. As with the three-stop proposal of 2013–2016, there would be three new stations located along McCowan Road at Lawrence Avenue, Scarborough Town Centre and Sheppard Avenue East.

In February 2020, Metrolinx released a cost–benefit analysis showing that the $5.5-billion project cost for the three-stop extension is double the estimated benefits of $2.8billion over 60 years. Benefits included reducing travel time and cars on the road. Metrolinx CEO Phil Verster said the estimate of benefits was conservative and Metrolinx may improve the benefits over time.

SSE construction
On August 20, 2020, Metrolinx issued a request for proposals to design and carry out tunnelling work. A launch shaft would be constructed at the northeast corner of Sheppard Avenue East and McCowan Road, with an extraction shaft along Eglinton Avenue on the east side of Midland Road. In April 2021, Strabag was selected to design, build and finance the tunnel. The scope of the advance tunnel contract includes the following:

 tunnelling works for the  subway extension, from Kennedy Station to McCowan Road / Sheppard Avenue
 design and construction of launch and extraction shafts, tunnels, as well as headwalls for emergency exit buildings and stations
 supplying tunnel boring machines and installing segmental precast concrete tunnel liners
 activities necessary to build the tunnel (e.g. utility relocations, supports for shaft and headwalls, temporary power supply, lighting, ventilation, and drainage)

Construction on the extension began on June 23, 2021. The tunnel boring machine (TBM) was built by Herrenknecht in Schwanau, Germany. Arriving in early 2022, the TBM was transported via sea in multiple shipments for reassembly at the launch site. It will dig  of the  tunnel.

The stations, rails and systems (SRS) contract will be delivered using a progressive design–build delivery strategy. In September 2021, Metrolinx and Infrastructure Ontario released an RFQ to shortlist potential bidders. In February 2022, following close of the RFQ process, Metrolinx and Infrastructure Ontario released an RFP to 3 shortlisted bidders: Dragados (including AECOM), KSX Integrated Design-Builders (Kiewit and SNC-Lavalin), and Scarborough Transit Connect (Aecon, FCC Construccion, and Mott MacDonald). In November 2022, Metrolinx and Infrastructure Ontario announced that Scarborough Transit Connect was the successful bidder and would work with the province over an 18- to 24-month development phase to finalize the scope, risk allocation, project costs and project schedule. Once the development phase had concluded, Metrolinx would have the option to execute the project agreement with the development partner to progress to construction, which would include agreements on detailed designs and the final negotiated price. The scope of the SRS contract included the following:

 a  extension of Line 2 Bloor–Danforth subway
 Tunnelling work for the length of the alignment
 Three new stations: Lawrence Avenue and McCowan Road, Scarborough Centre, and a terminal station at McCowan Road and Sheppard Avenue
 Emergency exit buildings, traction power substations, and modifications at Kennedy station
 Transit connections to Line 2, Line 5 Eglinton, GO train service (Stouffville line), and Durham Region Transit bus service
 Operating systems for the extension

New stations

The northern terminus of the extension will be at Sheppard Avenue East and McCowan Road; it will have an adjacent TTC bus terminal as well as a pick-up and drop-off area. The station entrance will be at Sheppard Avenue and McCowan Road. The station design will provide for future expansion of Line 4 Sheppard to terminate at this station, as well as further expansion of Line 2 north of the station. Besides TTC buses, the bus terminal will also serve Durham Region Transit and York Region Transit.

The future Scarborough Centre station will be located on McCowan Road at a different location from the existing Scarborough Centre station, which will be decommissioned. The new station facilities will be on the north side of McCowan station (also to be decommissioned) and will occupy most of the block bounded by McCowan Road, Progress Avenue, Grangeway Avenue and Busby Drive. The main entrance will be near McCowan Road and Progress Avenue. The new station will have a new Scarborough Centre Bus Terminal serving TTC, GO Transit and Durham Region Transit buses. The bus terminal will be the western terminus of the planned Durham–Scarborough bus rapid transit corridor. The station will also have a pick-up and drop-off area.

A third new, future Lawrence East station will be located beside the Scarborough General Hospital at the northwest corner of Lawrence Avenue East and McCowan Road in a different location from the existing Lawrence East station. There will be entrances at the northwest and southwest corners of Lawrence Avenue and McCowan. There will be a bus terminal on the south side of Lawrence Avenue between Valparaiso Avenue and McCowan Road.

West to Mississauga 

The TTC's Rapid Transit Expansion Study, published in 2001, identified three possible western extensions to the line. The first was a  link to Sherway Gardens, with a station added at the East Mall at a later date. The second included an additional  from Sherway Gardens to Dixie Road, while a further section from Dixie Road to Mississauga City Centre, which included three stations, was considered but rejected due to cost and planning considerations. This was replaced by a planned Dundas LRT run by MiWay going from Kipling station to Hurontario Street, linking to the Hurontario LRT as part of the MoveOntario 2020 transit plan. This plan was revived, along with the Jane LRT, the Finch West LRT extensions, the Waterfront LRTs, and others, by the Feeling Congested? report by the City of Toronto in 2013, as an "unfunded future rapid transit project".

References

External links 

 
 TTC subway web page
 Transit Toronto: A history of subways on Bloor and Queen Streets
 Scarborough Subway Extension (SSE) about three-stop SSE, published by Metrolinx

2
Railway lines opened in 1966
4 ft 10⅞ in gauge railways
Rapid transit lines in Canada
1966 establishments in Ontario